Miguel Ángel Óscar Eyama Mangue (born 8 July 1998) is an Equatorial Guinean footballer who plays as a goalkeeper for Futuro Kings FC and the Equatorial Guinea national team.

International career
Eyama was included in Rodolfo Bodipo's 23-men list for the 2018 African Nations Championship.

Statistics

International

References

External links
CAF profile

1998 births
Living people
Equatoguinean footballers
Equatorial Guinea international footballers
Association football goalkeepers
Futuro Kings FC players
Equatorial Guinea A' international footballers
2018 African Nations Championship players